William Roe may refer to:
William Roe (civil servant) (1748–1826), English customs official and auditor
William F. Roe (1904–1982), Irish electrical engineer
William Roe (priest) (died 1882), Anglican Archdeacon in Ireland
William James Roe (1843—1921), American writer 
Bill Roe (cricketer) (1861–1937), English cricketer
Bill Roe (American football) (1958–2003), American football linebacker
Gordon Roe (William Gordon Roe, 1932–1999), English bishop
Billy Roe (born 1957), former Indy Racing League driver

See also
William Rowe (disambiguation)